Stanwix Ridge is a broad, partly ice-covered coastal ridge or promontory in the Wilson Hills. It extends to the southwest part of Davies Bay immediately west of McLeod Glacier. Photographed from aircraft of U.S. Navy Operation Highjump, 1946–47. First visited in March 1961 by an airborne field party from ANARE (Australian National Antarctic Research Expeditions) (Magga Dan, 1961) led by Phillip Law. Named for Captain John Stanwix, helicopter pilot with the expedition.

Ridges of Oates Land